Men Against Rape and Discrimination or MARD/M.A.R.D is a 2013 social campaign launched by India film director and actor Farhan Akhtar. The word "MARD" ("Mard";) has been used in the short form of the campaign name. The campaign aims to raise social awareness against rape and discrimination of women.

From its launch, the campaign became a topic of discussion in several social networking sites and has received positive feedback from actors like Shahrukh Khan, Priyanka Chopra, Arjun Rampal, and Hrithik Roshan.

History 
Akhtar conceived MARD after an incident in August 2012. Pallavi Purkayastha, a Mumbai lawyer, was brutally murdered by her watchman for fighting for her dignity because he tried to sexually assault her. Akhtar launched his campaign in March 2013.

Initiatives 

In March 2013, Akhthar performed at a college concert in Bangalore wearing a t-shirt with MARD's logo. He also attempted to popularize this campaign using social networking sites. The tweets posted by Akhtar were hugely popular. In an interview, Akhtar stated that he wanted to bring the campaign to education institutions, such as schools and colleges, "to drive home the message that women need to be respected."

Farhan Akhtar, who initiated the social campaign, was also seen promoting the cause at Indian Premiere League season six where he distributed 70,000 moustaches among the audience on 26 April 2013 at Eden Gardens, Kolkata during the Kolkata Knight Riders vs Kings XI Punjab match in support of the initiative. This initiative was supported by Adam Gilchrist, Gautam Gambhir, Shaan, and many others who sported the moustache in the stadium.

Actor Mahesh Babu and cricketer Sachin Tendulkar joined the initiative in June 2013. Both Mahesh Babu and Sachin Tendulkar lent their voice to record a poem, written by Farhan's father Javed Akhtar.

Reactions 
After its launch, the campaign became a trending topic on different social networking sites, including Twitter and Facebook. The initiative received positive feedback and support from many actors, including Shahrukh Khan, Priyanka Chopra, Mahesh Babu, Arjun Rampal, Hrithik Roshan, Shahid Kapoor, Vidya Balan and Musician - "Mukesh Officials" etc. Akhtar's tweets were actively re-tweeted by Priyanka Chopra, Arjun Rampal, Sonam Kapoor and Shabana Azmi.

See also 
 2012 Delhi gang rape case
 Criminal Law (Amendment) Ordinance, 2013

References 

2013 in India
Feminist organisations in India
Violence against women in India
Men's movement in India
Sexual abuse victims advocacy